Denys Laurence Hobson (born 3 September 1951 in Port Elizabeth) is a former South African first-class cricketer.  Hobson played as a right-handed batsman and legbreak bowler for Eastern Province and Western Province. His career lasted from 1970–71 to 1984–85.

Educated at Kingswood College, Hobson played for Eastern Province in the Nuffield week from 1970 to 1971. He represented South African schools in 1971. He furthered his studies at Rhodes University and played for South African Universities in 1972 and 1973.

Regarded by many as South Africa's best legbreak bowler, before, during and after the years of isolation, he was invited to play in World Series Cricket in Australia in 1977. Because he was an amateur player, for political reasons he was not allowed to play. Graeme Pollock who joined Hobson on this trip, suffered the same fate. Hobson played in a 105 first class matches, taking 374 wickets at an average of 27.52. He maintained a strike rate of 59.1 balls per wicket. In 90 Currie Cup matches he took 319 wickets.

He played for South Africa in four unofficial "Tests" during the Apartheid years and was South African Cricketer of the Year in 1975.

External links
Denys Hobson at Cricinfo

1951 births
Living people
South African cricketers
Eastern Province cricketers
Western Province cricketers
South African Universities cricketers
Cricketers from Port Elizabeth
White South African people
Rhodes University alumni
Alumni of Kingswood College (South Africa)